Ortona is a coastal town and municipality of the Province of Chieti in the Italian region of Abruzzo, with some 23,000 inhabitants.

In 1943 Ortona was the site of a  bloody battle, known as  "Western Stalingrad". A patron saint of Ortona is Saint Thomas the Apostle (Tommaso), whose relics were brought to Ortona in the 13th century by a sailor and are kept in the Cathedral of Saint Thomas.

History 
The origins of Ortona are uncertain. Presumably, it was first inhabited by the Frentani, an Italic population. In 2005, during works near the Castle, a Bronze Age settlement was discovered, and the Roman town largely coincided with this first settlement. Some sections of paved roads and urban walls, as well as some archaeological findings are the only remains of this period. Ortona remained a part of the Eastern Roman Empire (later  Byzantine Empire) for several centuries, before it was annexed by the Kingdom of the Lombards. In 803 the Franks incorporated Ortona into the county of Chieti. From that date on, the town remained tied to Chieti and its territory.

In 1258 the relics of the Apostle Thomas were brought to Ortona by the sailor Leone Acciaiuoli.  In 1302 the Croatian lord George Šubić raided Ortona and extracted tribute from its denizens. In the first half of the 15th century its walls were built, and during this period Ortona fought with the nearby town of Lanciano in a fierce war that ended in 1427. On June 30, 1447, ships from Venice destroyed the port of Ortona; consequently the King of Sicily at that time commissioned the construction of a Castle to dominate the renovated port. In 1582 the town was acquired by Margaret of Parma, daughter of Emperor Charles V and Duchess of Parma. In 1584 Margaret decided to build a great mansion (known as Palazzo Farnese), which was never completed due to her death.

After the establishment of the Kingdom of Italy in 1860, Ortona became one of the first sea resorts on the Adriatic Sea. On 9 September 1943, the royal family of the House of Savoy left German-occupied Italy from the port of Ortona. The defensive Gustav Line was established by the Germans at Ortona (extending towards Cassino on the opposite side of Italy). Ortona offered the Allies a supply port on the Adriatic and was fiercely defended by the Germans. The struggle between the German paratroopers and the 2nd Canadian Infantry Brigade attracted the attention of the international press, leading this battle to be known as "Little Stalingrad."

Transport 
Ortona is served from Port of Ortona, an important port of Adriatic Sea.

Main sights
Cathedral of San Tommaso (relics of saint Thomas the Apostle)
Cathedral Museum 
Church of Santa Maria di Costantinopoli 
Church of Santa Caterina d'Alessandria 
Lighthouse
Medieval Aragona Castle
Museum of Ortona battle 
Moro River Canadian War Cemetery
Trabucchi (fishing machines) on sea

Ortona is home of several beaches that appeal to tourists and one historical museum based on the battle of Ortona. The Abruzzo, Lazio and Molise National Park is not far either.

International relations

Ortona is twinned with:
 Cassino, Italy, since 1991
 Volgograd, Russia, since 2013
 Metkovic, Croatia, since 2016

People
 The composer Francesco Paolo Tosti was born in Ortona.
 Pornographic actor and producer Rocco Siffredi was also born in Ortona.

See also
Ortona Lighthouse

References

Sources

External links

 
The Battle of Ortona - The "Italian Stalingrad" - December 20-28, 1943
Inside Abruzzo: Insider Tips Uncovered
The sad short story of the Ortona’s funicolar

 
Coastal towns in Abruzzo